The enzyme hydroxymethylglutaryl-CoA hydrolase (EC 3.1.2.5) catalyzes the reaction 

S-(2-hydroxyacyl)glutathione + H2O = glutathione + a 2-hydroxy carboxylate

This enzyme belongs to the family of hydrolases, specifically those acting on thioester bonds.  The systematic name is S-(2-hydroxyacyl)glutathione hydrolase. Other names in common use include β-hydroxy-beta-methylglutaryl coenzyme A hydrolase, β-hydroxy-β-methylglutaryl coenzyme A deacylase, hydroxymethylglutaryl coenzyme A hydrolase, hydroxymethylglutaryl coenzyme A deacylase, and 3-hydroxy-3-methylglutaryl-CoA hydrolase.

References

 

EC 3.1.2
Enzymes of unknown structure